The 2021–22 season was the 67th season of TRAU FC in existence and third season in the I-League

Squad

Transfers

Transfers in

Transfers out

Current technical staff 
As of 15 March 2020.

Pre-season

Competitions

I-League

League table

References

2021–22 I-League by team
TRAU FC seasons